This is the production discography for American producer Benny Blanco.

Albums and singles

Single peaks 

The following singles peaked inside the top ten on the Billboard Hot 100, Hot 100 Airplay (Radio Songs) and/or the UK Singles Chart.

2008: "I Kissed a Girl" 
2008: "Hot n Cold" 
2008: "Circus" 
2009: "Don't Trust Me" 
2009: "Tik Tok" 
2010: "Eenie Meenie" 
2010: "Blah Blah Blah" 
2010: "Your Love Is My Drug" 
2010: "My First Kiss" 
2010: "California Gurls" 
2010: "Please Don't Go" 
2010: "Dynamite" 
2010: "Teenage Dream" 
2010: "We R Who We R" 
2010: "Teenage Dream" 
2011: "Blow" 
2011: "No Sleep" 
2011: "Stereo Hearts" 
2011: "Ass Back Home" 
2011: "Moves Like Jagger" 
2012: "Payphone" 
2012: "Work Hard, Play Hard" 
2012: "Heart Attack" 
2012: "Die Young" 
2012: "Diamonds" 
2013: "Other Side of Love" 
2014: "If I Lose Myself" 
2014: "Me and My Broken Heart" 
2014: "Maps" 
2014: "Animals" 
2014: "Black Widow" 
2014: "Don't" 
2015: "Fire and the Flood" 
2015: "Same Old Love" 
2015: "Love Yourself" 
2016: "Cold Water" 
2016: "Luv" 
2016: "Don't Wanna Know" 
2017: "Castle on the Hill" 
2017: "Lonely Together" 
2017: "Perfect" 
2018: "Freaky Friday" 
2018: "2002" (Anne-Marie)
2018: "Eastside" 
2019: "Señorita" 
2020: "Lonely" 
2022: "Bad Decisions"

References 

Discographies of American artists
Electronic music discographies
Hip hop discographies
Pop music discographies
Rhythm and blues discographies
Rock music discographies